Lotna is a 1959 Polish war film directed by Andrzej Wajda.

Overview
This highly symbolic film is both the director's tribute to the long and glorious history of the Polish cavalry, as well as a more ambiguous portrait of the passing of an era. Wajda was the son of a Polish Cavalry officer who was murdered in the Katyn massacre.

The horse Lotna represents the entire Romantic tradition in culture, a tradition that had a huge influence in the course of Polish history and the formation of Polish literature. Lotna is Wajda's meditation on the historical breaking point that was 1939, as well as a reflection on the ending of an entire era for literature and culture in Poland and in Europe as a whole. Writing of the film, Wajda states that it "held great hopes for him, perhaps more than any other." Sadly, Wajda came to think of Lotna "a failure as a film."

The film remains highly controversial, as Wajda includes a mythical scene in which Polish horsemen suicidally charge a unit of German tanks, an event that never actually happened.

Synopsis
Poland has been invaded by Nazi Germany. Lotna, a beautiful mare that belonged to a wealthy nobleman (Henryk Cudnowski) is given to Captain Chodakiewicz (Jerzy Pichelski), the commander of a Polish Cavalry squadron, and immediately becomes a bone of contention for everyone in the unit.

Lieutenant Wodnicki (Adam Pawlikowski), Cadet Grabowski (Jerzy Moes) and Sergeant Major Laton (Mieczysław Łoza) jealously scheme among themselves to get their hands on the horse. However, the war takes the lives of Captain Chodakiewicz and Cadet Grabowski, and Lotna falls is passed to Wodnicki. Laton feels he should get the animal and so he steals Lotna and flees amidst the abandoned supply wagons and equipment of the retreating Polish Army.

Cast 
 Jerzy Pichelski as Captain Chodakiewicz
 Adam Pawlikowski as Lieutenant Wodnicki
 Jerzy Moes as Cadet Grabowski
 Mieczysław Łoza as Sergeant Major Latoś
 Bożena Kurowska as Ewa
 Henryk Cudnowski as nobleman
 Irena Malkiewicz
 Bronisław Dardziński
 Wiesław Gołas

Legacy
During an ad limina visit of the Polish bishops to the Vatican, Pope Francis referenced the scene in Lotna depicting an equine competition won by a priest, encouraging the Polish bishops to charge forward like the priest in the film and give witness to their faith in society. When learning that the pope had referenced his film, Andrzej Wajda replied that it was worth living as long as he did.

See also 
 Cinema of Poland
 List of Polish language films
 Karol Rómmel

References

External links
 
 Essay on Lotna by Peter Gessner

1959 films
1950s Polish-language films
Polish black-and-white films
Invasion of Poland
Films directed by Andrzej Wajda
Polish World War II films